Haidel is a mountain in the Bavarian Forest, Bavaria, Germany.

Mountains of Bavaria
Bohemian Forest
Freyung-Grafenau